Sphecomorpha is a genus of beetles in the family Cerambycidae, containing the following species:

 Sphecomorpha chalybea Newman, 1838
 Sphecomorpha faurei Tavakilian & Penaherrera-Leiva, 2007
 Sphecomorpha forficulifera (Gounelle, 1913)
 Sphecomorpha murina (Klug, 1825)
 Sphecomorpha rufa Gounelle, 1911
 Sphecomorpha vespiventris (Bates, 1880)

References

Rhinotragini